The following is a partial list of the "F" codes for Medical Subject Headings (MeSH), as defined by the United States National Library of Medicine (NLM).

This list continues the information at List of MeSH codes (E07). Codes following these are found at List of MeSH codes (F02). For other MeSH codes, see List of MeSH codes.

The source for this content is the set of 2006 MeSH Trees from the NLM.

– behavior and behavior mechanisms

– adaptation, psychological
  – feedback, psychological
  – orientation

– attitude
  – attitude of health personnel
  – attitude to computers
  – attitude to death
  – attitude to health
  – health knowledge, attitudes, practice

– behavior
  – accident proneness
  – adolescent behavior
  – behavior, animal
  – animal communication
  – echolocation
  – vocalization, animal
  – animal migration
  – appetitive behavior
  – grooming
  – predatory behavior
  – consummatory behavior
  – nesting behavior
  – predatory behavior
  – sex behavior, animal
  – copulation
  – pair bond
  – eliminative behavior, animal
  – escape reaction
  – feeding behavior
  – cannibalism
  – freezing reaction, cataleptic
  – homing behavior
  – immobility response, tonic
  – behavioral symptoms
  – affective symptoms
  – aggression
  – agonistic behavior
  – catatonia
  – child reactive disorders
  – coprophagia
  – delusions
  – depersonalization
  – depression
  – encopresis
  – enuresis
  – hearing loss, functional
  – malingering
  – mental fatigue
  – obsessive behavior
  – paranoid behavior
  – schizophrenic language
  – self-injurious behavior
  – self mutilation
  – suicide
  – suicide, assisted
  – suicide, attempted
  – stress, psychological
  – child behavior
  – infant behavior
  – codependency (psychology)
  – communication
  – communication barriers
  – disclosure
  – mandatory reporting
  – parental notification
  – truth disclosure
  – duty to warn
  – whistleblowing
  – duty to recontact
  – information dissemination
  – interdisciplinary communication
  – language
  – narration
  – negotiating
  – nonverbal communication
  – blushing
  – crying
  – facial expression
  – smiling
  – kinesics
  – gestures
  – laughter
  – manual communication
  – sign language
  – persuasive communication
  – propaganda
  – verbal behavior
  – speech
  – speech intelligibility
  – drinking behavior
  – alcohol drinking
  – escape reaction
  – exploratory behavior
  – feeding behavior
  – fasting
  – food habits
  – food preferences
  – habits
  – fingersucking
  – food habits
  – nail biting
  – smoking
  – marijuana smoking
  – tongue habits
  – harm reduction
  – health behavior
  – patient compliance
  – self-examination
  – breast self-examination
  – treatment refusal
  – imitative behavior
  – impulsive behavior
  – compulsive behavior
  – behavior, addictive
  – inhibition (psychology)
  – proactive inhibition
  – reactive inhibition
  – motor activity
  – freezing reaction, cataleptic
  – immobility response, tonic
  – personal satisfaction
  – reproductive behavior
  – contraception behavior
  – risk reduction behavior
  – risk-taking
  – gambling
  – self stimulation
  – sexual behavior
  – coitus
  – coitus interruptus
  – courtship
  – extramarital relations
  – masturbation
  – prostitution
  – safe sex
  – sexual abstinence
  – sexual harassment
  – sexuality
  – bisexuality
  – heterosexuality
  – homosexuality
  – homosexuality, female
  – homosexuality, male
  – social behavior
  – aggression
  – altruism
  – anomie
  – ceremonial behavior
  – competitive behavior
  – cooperative behavior
  – deception
  – dehumanization
  – commodification
  – gift giving
  – helping behavior
  – mass behavior
  – permissiveness
  – professional misconduct
  – rejection (psychology)
  – scapegoating
  – shyness
  – social adjustment
  – social conformity
  – social desirability
  – social distance
  – social dominance
  – dominance-subordination
  – social facilitation
  – social identification
  – social isolation
  – stereotyping
  – spatial behavior
  – crowding
  – personal space
  – territoriality
  – stereotyped behavior
  – sucking behavior
  – tobacco use cessation
  – smoking cessation

– child rearing
  – toilet training

– defense mechanisms
  – acting out
  – denial (psychology)
  – displacement (psychology)
  – cathexis
  – scapegoating
  – fantasy
  – helplessness, learned
  – identification (psychology)
  – gender identity
  – perceptual defense
  – projection
  – scapegoating
  – rationalization
  – regression (psychology)
  – repression
  – repression-sensitization
  – sublimation

– emotions
  – affect
  – irritable mood
  – anger
  – rage
  – anxiety
  – anxiety, castration
  – koro (penis panic)
  – dental anxiety
  – bereavement
  – grief
  – boredom
  – euphoria
  – expressed emotion
  – fear
  – dental anxiety
  – panic
  – frustration
  – guilt
  – shame
  – happiness
  – hate
  – hostility
  – jealousy
  – laughter
  – loneliness
  – love

– human characteristics

– human development
  – adolescent development
  – child development
  – language development
  – child language
  – crying

– mental competency

– motivation
  – achievement
  – aspirations (psychology)
  – conflict (psychology)
  – drive
  – hunger
  – thirst
  – exploratory behavior
  – food deprivation
  – goals
  – handling (psychology)
  – instinct
  – intention
  – power (psychology)
  – water deprivation

– neurobehavioral manifestations
  – apraxias
  – gait apraxia
  – catatonia
  – confusion
  – delirium
  – consciousness disorders
  – memory disorders
  – amnesia
  – amnesia, anterograde
  – amnesia, retrograde
  – amnesia, transient global
  – korsakoff syndrome
  – mental retardation
  – perceptual disorders
  – agnosia
  – gerstmann syndrome
  – prosopagnosia
  – auditory perceptual disorders
  – hallucinations
  – illusions
  – phantom limb
  – psychomotor disorders
  – apraxias
  – apraxia, ideomotor
  – psychomotor agitation

– personality
  – assertiveness
  – authoritarianism
  – character 
  – creativeness
  – dependency (psychology)
  – empathy
  – individuality
  – intelligence
  – leadership
  – machiavellianism
  – negativism
  – personality development
  – ego
  – reality testing
  – extraversion (psychology)
  – id
  – identification (psychology)
  – gender identity
  – identity crisis
  – individuation
  – introversion (psychology)
  – moral development
  – psychosexual development
  – gender identity
  – latency period (psychology)
  – oral stage
  – self concept
  – self assessment (psychology)
  – self disclosure
  – self efficacy
  – superego
  – type a personality
  – unconscious (psychology)
  – temperament

– psychology, social
  – double bind interaction
  – family
  – adult children
  – birth order
  – family characteristics
  – marital status
  – divorce
  – marriage
  – single person
  – single parent
  – widowhood
  – family relations
  – intergenerational relations
  – maternal behavior
  – maternal-fetal relations
  – maternal deprivation
  – parent-child relations
  – father-child relations
  – mother-child relations
  – parenting
  – paternal behavior
  – paternal deprivation
  – sibling relations
  – nuclear family
  – only child
  – parents
  – fathers
  – mothers
  – single parent
  – surrogate mothers
  – siblings
  – spouses
  – single-parent family
  – group processes
  – consensus
  – focus groups
  – group structure
  – peer group
  – peer review
  – peer review, health care
  – peer review, research
  – role
  – professional role
  – nurse's role
  – physician's role
  – sick role
  – sensitivity training groups
  – social distance
  – internal-external control
  – interpersonal relations
  – dissent and disputes
  – intergenerational relations
  – interprofessional relations
  – interdisciplinary communication
  – physician-nurse relations
  – negotiating
  – professional-family relations
  – professional-patient relations
  – dentist-patient relations
  – nurse-patient relations
  – physician-patient relations
  – researcher-subject relations
  – trust
  – life style
  – life change events
  – morale
  – morals
  – conscience
  – ethics
  – moral development
  – virtues
  – paternalism
  – prejudice
  – psychosocial deprivation
  – social values

The list continues at List of MeSH codes (F02).

F01